The Winner's Journey is the debut studio album by Australian Idol 2007 winner Natalie Gauci. As opposed to the previous format of releasing the winner's album consisting of recordings of the winner's live performance on the show, the album is composed of full studio-recorded versions of songs performed by Gauci on the show, including her debut single "Here I Am".

The album also includes a bonus DVD which features an "exciting in-depth interview" with John Foreman (producer) and Ross Fraser (Sony BMG A&R); as she tells her story of her journey to Idol fame and demonstrates her unique song arrangements on piano.

Critical reception

Matthew Chisling from Allmusic gave The Winner's Journey a generally positive review, saying "What makes the album work is that the tunes included are a mixed bag of pop hits, jazz tunes, and rock ballads that Gauci effortlessly sings through. However, she manages to put her own stamp on many great tracks by incorporating her skills as a piano genius, putting dark spins on crowd favorites (such as "Apologize" and "Umbrella")." He also called it "a strong base for Gauci's next effort".

Track listing

Charts and certifications

Charts

Certifications

References

2007 debut albums
Natalie Gauci albums
Australian Idol